The Best Rock Ballads... Ever!- is a compilation album released by EMI in early 2007. It contains what it considers to be the best rock ballads recorded by international artists.

Track listing

CD 1
Extreme - "More Than Words" (1991)
Marillion - "Kayleigh" (1985)  
Soundgarden - "Black Hole Sun" (1994)
Mr. Big - "Wild World" (1993)
Whitesnake - "Is This Love?" (1987)  
ZZ Top - "Rough Boy" (1985) 
Richard Marx - "Right Here Waiting" (1989)
Alannah Myles - "Black Velvet" (1989)
Cutting Crew - "(I Just) Died in Your Arms" (1986)
Status Quo - "In the Army Now" (1986)
Crowded House - "Weather with You" (1992)
Roxy Music - "Avalon" (1982)
Sinéad O'Connor - "Nothing Compares 2 U" (1990)
Skunk Anansie - "Hedonism (Just Because You Feel Good)" (1997)

CD 2
Coldplay - "The Scientist" (2002)
Nick Cave and the Bad Seeds & Kylie Minogue - "Where the Wild Roses Grow" (1995) 
Simple Minds - "Don’t You (Forget About Me)" (1985)
Lenny Kravitz - "I Belong to You" (1998)
Billy Idol - "Sweet Sixteen" (1986)
Depeche Mode - "In Your Room" (1994)
The Music - "Turn Out the Lights" (2002)
Soul Asylum - "Runaway Train" (1993)
David Bowie - "Heroes" (1977)  
The Cure - "Lullaby" [single mix] (1989) 
The Waterboys - "When Ye Go Away" (1988)  
Lou Reed - "Perfect Day" (1972)
Archive - "Again" (2002)

CD 3
Santana - "Europa (Earth’s Cry Heaven’s Smile)" (1976)
Meat Loaf - "I’d Do Anything for Love (But I Won’t Do That)" (1993)
Rainbow - "Street of Dreams" (1983)
Saxon - "Broken Heroes" [live] (1985)  
Scorpions - "Still Loving You" (1984)
Judas Priest - "Before the Dawn" (1978)
Cinderella - "Dead Man’s Road" (1990)
Poison - "Every Rose Has Its Thorn" (1988)
Europe - "Carrie" (1987)
Temple of the Dog - "Call Me a Dog" (1991)
Living Colour - "Nothingness" (1993)
Faith No More - "Ashes to Ashes" (1997) 
Toto - "Anna" (1988)

CD 4
The Animals – "The House of the Rising Sun" (1964)
Gary Moore, featuring Phil Lynott - "Parisienne Walkways" (1979)
Joe Cocker - With a Little Help from My Friends" (1968)
Deep Purple - "Child in Time" [single edit] (1970)
Free - "Be My Friend" (1970)
Rush - "Closer to the Heart" (1977)
Genesis - "The Carpet Crawlers" (1974)
Steppenwolf - "Suicide" (1969)
Joe Satriani - "I Believe" (1989)
Jethro Tull - "Skating Away on the Thin Ice of the New Day" (1974)
Héroes del Silencio - "Avalancha" (1995)
Kiss - "Hard Luck Woman" (1976)

External links
 album description (in Polish)

Rock Ballads
2007 compilation albums
Rock compilation albums